Deerfoot Trail is a  freeway segment of Highway 2 in Calgary, Alberta, Canada.  It stretches the entire length of the city from south to north and links suburbs to downtown via Memorial Drive and 17 Avenue SE. The freeway begins south of Calgary where it splits from Macleod Trail, crosses the Bow River into city limits, and reaches the Stoney Trail ring road.  Crisscrossing twice more with the river, it intersects Glenmore Trail and Memorial Drive; the former is a major east–west expressway while the latter is a freeway spur into downtown.  In north Calgary, it crosses Highway 1 and passes Calgary International Airport before ending at a second interchange with Stoney Trail.  Highway 2 becomes the Queen Elizabeth II Highway as it continues north into Rocky View County towards Edmonton.

Originally called Blackfoot Trail Freeway upon the opening of the first section in 1971, it was renamed in 1974 to honour Deerfoot, a late-19th-century Siksika Nation (Blackfoot) long-distance runner known for his exceptional speed.  Subsequent sections opened in 1975, 1980, 1982 and 2003.  Deerfoot was not entirely a freeway until 2005 when the final of four at-grade intersections in southeast Calgary was converted to an interchange.  Well known for its frequent rush hour congestion and collisions, traffic levels have steadily increased as Calgary's population has tripled to over 1.2 million since 1971.  The mostly six-lane freeway is Alberta's busiest road with volume exceeding 173,000 vehicles per day between Highway 1 and Memorial Drive in 2019, more than twice that for which it was designed. The province of Alberta has been fiscally responsible for the road since 2000 but now seeks to offload maintenance and future improvement costs to the city of Calgary.  The two parties remain at odds over who should operate the road in the long-term but completed a joint study in 2021 that offered long and short-term recommendations for improvement. A $478 million commitment to the freeway by Alberta was later reduced to $210 million. A public–private partnership project to improve the road includes widening, bridge twinning and interchange improvements; work is tentatively scheduled to begin in late 2022 to be completed by 2026.

Route description

Overview

As a segment of Highway 2, Deerfoot Trail is a core route of the National Highway System and a key international corridor. It is also part of Calgary's Primary Goods Movement Network and is identified as a skeletal road in the city's Transportation Plan, a limited-access route important for long distance travellers, and is the only route that stretches the entire length of the city from north to south. From its split with Highway 2A (Macleod Trail) near the hamlet of De Winton in the south, it runs north to Stoney Trail at Calgary's northern city limit where it becomes the Queen Elizabeth II Highway. The freeway roughly bisects the city, though it lies entirely east of Centre Street which officially marks the boundary between the east and west side of the city.  From its southern terminus until Memorial Drive, Deerfoot approximates the course of the Bow River.  Initially the freeway is on the east side, then crosses to the west bank, and finally back to the east before the river and Memorial Drive veer west at Inglewood towards downtown. Most of the road's northern half parallels Nose Creek, a tributary of the Bow.

Deerfoot is a divided freeway for its entire 46.4-kilometre length, ranging from four to eight lanes wide. It was the first major HTCB installation in Canada. The entire route is paved with asphalt, except for a  concrete section in south Calgary.

Alberta Transportation, the branch of the Alberta government who operate and maintain all highways in the province, signed a contract with Carmacks Enterprises for maintenance of Deerfoot Trail from Stoney Trail in south Calgary to the northern city limit. The province intends to return control of the freeway to the city, but it is desirable for the city to avoid the significant maintenance and rehabilitation costs associated with the freeway and have the road remain under provincial control for as long as possible. Former Calgary mayor Rod Sykes said, "I wouldn’t take on the problems of the Deerfoot if I were at City Hall now."

South Calgary
Deerfoot Trail begins as a rural freeway near De Winton where two lanes fork to the northeast from Macleod Trail and descend across Dunbow Road toward the Bow River. It crosses the river on twin  bridges constructed over an environmentally sensitive area of the valley. Rising from the river, the freeway enters Calgary limits and its southern suburban neighbourhoods of Cranston and Seton to which access is provided by a partial cloverleaf interchange.  A major junction at the Stoney Trail ring road immediately follows, with signage recommending that traffic destined for the International Airport, Edmonton, and Medicine Hat use eastbound Stoney Trail as a bypass. Continuing north as an eight lane freeway, Deerfoot passes between the communities of McKenzie Lake and McKenzie Towne, crossing 130 Avenue SE to the south terminus of Barlow Trail.  It then reduces to six lanes, curving to the west through the neighbourhoods of Douglasdale and Douglasglen across the Bow River on the Ivor Strong Bridge, named after John Ivor Strong who served as Chief Commissioner for Calgary until 1971.

Immediately after the river, Deerfoot merges with the major routes of Anderson Road and Bow Bottom Trail, often a point of congestion at rush hour. In both directions, traffic through the outdated interchange is reduced from three lanes to two. The freeway curves north along the river's west bank to cross Southland Drive, paralleling Blackfoot Trail near the community of Acadia. North of Acadia, the freeway bisects a large area of commercial development for several kilometres before reaching a major interchange at Glenmore Trail. The interchange is generally identified as the second of two major congestion points on Deerfoot in south Calgary, the so called "Glenmore squeeze", where traffic is reduced to two lanes each way over Glenmore. Deerfoot turns sharply to the east and again crosses the Bow River on the Calf Robe Bridge, named after a Siksika Nation elder. Veering back to the north, it follows the river's east bank across Peigan Trail to a partial cloverleaf interchange at 17 Avenue SE, passing the neighbourhoods of Dover and Southview.  Deerfoot meets Memorial Drive, a major freeway spur into downtown, near Pearce Estate Wetland, Calgary Zoo and the Max Bell Centre, and continues into north Calgary while the Bow River turns west towards downtown.

North Calgary
In north Calgary, the freeway climbs along the east side of Nose Creek, a tributary of the Bow River. From Memorial Drive, it passes the Vista Heights neighbourhood to 16 Avenue NE (Highway 1/Trans-Canada Highway); this section has been largely unchanged since its completion in 1975. The six lane freeway enters light commercial development north of 32 Avenue NE and passes McKnight Boulevard, providing access to airport-related light industrial areas as well as Nose Hill Park, which is visible to the west..  Access to Huntington Hills and Deerfoot Mall are then provided by an interchange at 64 Avenue NE. Beddington Trail splits to the northwest from Deerfoot, following Nose Creek into a large residential area of north Calgary that includes the neighbourhoods of Country Hills, Panorama Hills, and Hidden Valley.  The speed limit on Deerfoot increases to 110 km/h as development tapers in an increasingly rural area of north Calgary.  After West Nose Creek Park, an interchange with Airport Trail serves as the primary access for Calgary International Airport, and to the west, the neighbourhood of Harvest Hills via 96 Avenue NE. North of Airport Trail, the freeway curves northeast through light commercial areas across Country Hills Boulevard and ends at an interchange with Stoney Trail. It continues north to Airdrie as the Queen Elizabeth II Highway.

Traffic and collisions

Deerfoot Trail is Alberta's busiest highway by a significant margin over Glenmore Trail, with peak daily congestion lasting as many as four hours. Its most travelled stretch is between Memorial Drive and 16 Avenue NE (Trans-Canada Highway) as traffic from Calgary's northern and eastern suburbs converge to travel via Memorial Drive into downtown, in addition to traffic transiting the city and other intra-city trips. The freeway was designed to carry approximately 65,000 vehicles per day but carried 173,500 vehicles between Memorial Drive and Highway 1 in 2019.

In late 2013, the southeastern segment of Stoney Trail was opened to traffic. In conjunction with the northeast portion which opened in 2009, it formed a full eastern bypass of Calgary providing an alternate route for traffic transiting the city. Traffic levels on Deerfoot Trail decreased in the year following the opening, but have since risen to pre-Stoney levels. In a 2016 study, Calgary ranked tenth in traffic congestion among major Canadian cities, with drivers spending nearly 16 hours of the year in standstill traffic.

The excessive volume of traffic on Deerfoot Trail is a contributing factor to the 10,000 collisions recorded between 2002 and 2007, including 24 fatalities. Constable Jeff Klatt of the Calgary Police Service stated that there is a "consensus among police officers that it’s dangerous to do traffic stops" on Deerfoot Trail. A 1993 incident in which a stolen vehicle struck and killed a police officer on Deerfoot was the catalyst for the Calgary Police Service's acquisition of a helicopter. 2013 statistics confirmed that Deerfoot Trail had more crashes and traffic jams than any other road in Calgary. Deerfoot has many entrances and exits in close proximity which exacerbates problems, but some have attributed a portion of the congestion to driver error. Constable Jim Lebedeff of the Calgary Police Service stated, "a lot of people don’t understand, or don’t want to understand, how to merge properly." 30% of respondents to a 2016 poll stated that the main reason they avoid Deerfoot Trail is because they do not feel safe on the freeway.

In 2015, plans for improvements to Deerfoot Trail near Southland Drive were cancelled and a study was initiated to determine the best course of action to begin improving the freeway. The Calf Robe Bridge is also prone to collisions as its concrete deck becomes slick in cold weather, and large curves precede and follow the bridge. A 1996 crash on the bridge claimed the life of a teenager when her northbound car struck the rear of a fire truck parked in the left shoulder attending to an accident in the southbound lanes.  Poor visibility due to the curve prior to the bridge was a contributing factor in a successful lawsuit by the girl's family against Calgary.

Interchanges

The freeway features 21 interchanges of varying design. The most recent interchanges to be constructed at the north and south ends of the freeway are more consistently of the partial cloverleaf type, a design highly used in Alberta as it is a desirable compromise between cost and capacity. The two interchanges with Stoney Trail are cloverstack interchanges, where high capacity directional flyovers carry traffic turning left for movements with more traffic, and loop ramps service lesser used left turn movements. Older and less efficient designs are used at Deerfoot's intersections with both Glenmore Trail and Highway 1. The junction with Glenmore is an incomplete cloverleaf interchange; traffic northbound on Deerfoot does not have direct access to westbound Glenmore and one must first exit to the east, proceed through a traffic light behind Calgary Auto Mall, and enter Glenmore Trail from the north side. At Highway 1, a split diamond interchange significantly slows east-west traffic even outside of peak hours, because all left turn movements must pass through three sets of traffic lights. This outdated interchange was Calgary's most dangerous road junction in 2011, with 234 crashes recorded.

History

Predecessor highways

Prior to the completion of Deerfoot Trail, the historic alignment of Highway 2 in south Calgary was along Macleod Trail as an extension of 4 Street, parallel to a branch of the Canadian Pacific Railway from Calgary to Macleod. Macleod Trail has since been designated Highway 2A, on a routing largely the same as the original. It is now a busy expressway connecting Midnapore and other southwestern suburbs to downtown. The southernmost portion of the route from Highway 22X to De Winton would continue to serve as Highway 2 until completion of a Deerfoot Trail extension from its then southernmost point at the neighbourhood of Cranston to De Winton in 2003.

In north Calgary, Highway 2 was originally composed of four present-day routes: Edmonton Trail, 41 Avenue, 48 Avenue, and Barlow Trail. Edmonton Trail is now a busy urban street on the west bank of Nose Creek through the neighbourhood of Highland Park, but its alignment in the 1920s had it curving to the northeast across the creek along present-day 41 Avenue to 48 Avenue where it continued east past the airport to Barlow Trail and north to Edmonton as Highway 1, later renamed to Highway 2.

By the 1960s, Highway 2 had been realigned to follow Macleod Trail until turning east at Glenmore Trail before continuing north on Blackfoot Trail, veering to the northeast, and crossing the Bow River to join Barlow Trail to the north city limit. The former Edmonton Trail was re-signed as Highway 2A.  As the airport continued to expand, 48 Avenue was reduced to an airport service road after the construction of McKnight Boulevard. Long after the completion and opening of Deerfoot Trail and its signing as Highway 2, the segment of Barlow Trail north of McKnight Blvd was closed in 2011 to allow construction of a new  runway at Calgary International Airport.

Early plans and construction
Due to its quickly rising population in the 1960s, Calgary initiated planning for the construction of an extensive freeway and expressway network that included numerous north–south and east–west routes. Many of these routes were ultimately not developed into freeways, but a 1967 transportation study planned for a major north–south freeway running along the west side of the Calgary Airport across the Bow River into Inglewood, remaining west of the Bow River through present-day Fish Creek Provincial Park. Initially called the Blackfoot Trail Freeway, the first segment stretched from the northern city boundary (then near Deerfoot's present-day split with Beddington Trail) to 16 Avenue NE, opening in 1971. It was named after a historic route that approximated the location of present-day Memorial Drive across Nose Creek, between Barlow Trail and the community of St. George's Heights, now the location of the Calgary Zoo. This trail appears on Calgary maps as early as 1891.

In 1974, signs were unveiled renaming the road after a Siksika Nation long-distance runner nicknamed Deerfoot. Several namesakes had been considered, including James Gladstone, Old Sun, and Walking Buffalo. In 1884, Deerfoot became known in the Calgary area as a great talent and won races against runners from as far away as Europe.  Controversy arose when Deerfoot won a race but his opponent was credited with the victory. At a rematch to settle the dispute, the same result occurred. Unhappy with the result, his attitude began to change; he committed theft from a cabin, and was later the subject of a massive manhunt. He spent time in and out of police custody for various crimes, before dying of tuberculosis while in prison for assault. He had reportedly been receiving medical treatment for the disease since his arrival to the prison.

In December 1974, Premier Peter Lougheed reiterated his opposition to the planned routing for the southern portion of Deerfoot Trail, which would take the freeway along the west side of the Bow River through Fish Creek Park. Lougheed acknowledged that diverting the freeway to the east would be significantly more expensive, but was firm on protecting and preserving Fish Creek as an urban park. Bow Bottom Trail, a major arterial road, was built in the wide right of way that had been reserved for Deerfoot Trail.

A second section extending the road further south to 17 Avenue SE opened on 20 January 1975, at a cost of $35 million. The new pavement continued south alongside Nose Creek and was originally to carry on straight across the river into Inglewood, but residents of the neighbourhood fought adamantly against construction of the freeway in their community.  City Hall conceded, resulting in the present-day alignment that keeps the freeway east of the Bow River as it passes downtown.

Completion

On 2 December 1980, an extension of Deerfoot Trail south to Glenmore Trail was opened, able to handle up to 80,000 vehicles per day. It was advertised as an alternative north–south route to the nearby Blackfoot Trail. Construction of the $70 million  extension took more than two years, and was described as "badly needed" by mayor Ralph Klein. The new concrete road included the Calf Robe Bridge over the Bow River and an interchange at 43 Avenue SE, now called Peigan Trail. The next section, then intended to be the final segment, extended Deerfoot to Highway 22X (now Stoney Trail) on the altered alignment east of the river.  It opened on 22 November 1982 at a cost of $165 million. It featured interchanges at Southland Drive and Anderson Road/Bow Bottom Trail. A second crossing of the Bow River on the Ivor Strong Bridge took Deerfoot to an at-grade intersection with 24 Street, and a signalized intersection at Barlow Trail which had been extended south from Glenmore Trail as part of the Deerfoot project.

Highway 2 was realigned in Calgary to follow Macleod Trail north to Anderson Road, then east on Anderson Road to the new interchange at Deerfoot Trail where it turned north to follow Deerfoot to the city limit near the airport. Plans to add a third level flyover at Memorial Drive by 1987 did not come to fruition.  The original configuration of the interchange was modified in 1983 to add a loop ramp for traffic turning northbound onto Deerfoot Trail from eastbound Memorial.  A new ramp was also constructed for traffic turning west onto Memorial from northbound Deerfoot, passing underneath eastbound Memorial before joining westbound Memorial from the left.

The province took over responsibility from the City of Calgary in 2000 to upgrade the route to a freeway and render the CANAMEX Corridor a contiguous route through the city, after which they intended to return the road to the city. In 2003, a $100 million extension was completed extending Deerfoot Trail from its junction with Highway 22X to its present terminus near De Winton. During planning, the segment had been temporarily designated as Highway 2X. Prior to the  project, Deerfoot was effectively disconnected from the rest of Highway 2. Traffic continuing south to Fort Macleod proceeded west on a two lane bridge carrying Highway 22X over the Bow River, before turning south onto Macleod Trail, which was then designated as Highway 2. The section of Highway 22X over the river became Stoney Trail (Highway 201) in 2013, and a second bridge was completed in 2007 to carry the westbound lanes, while the original bridge built in 1974 carries the eastbound lanes.

Interchanges were constructed at Barlow Trail, 130 Avenue SE, McKenzie Towne Boulevard, Cranston Avenue, and Dunbow Road between 2000 and 2004. The last set of traffic lights was removed in 2005 upon completion of the interchange at Douglasdale Boulevard, making the entire length of Deerfoot Trail a freeway.

Since completion
In an effort to reduce head-on collisions caused by vehicles crossing over the grass median in north Calgary, the installation of high tension cable barriers was completed in the first half of 2007. In 2009, modifications were made to the interchange of Peigan, Barlow, and Deerfoot Trails, built in 1979.  The existing westbound to southbound ramp left little distance for traffic to merge, causing bottlenecks. The ramp was modified to first curve north and then loop back underneath itself, extending the merge distance before the three southbound lanes crossed Ogden Road and then the Bow River. In November 2009, construction of a major interchange at the northern terminus of Deerfoot Trail was completed, connecting it to the northeast and northwest sections of Stoney Trail.

In August 2013, 96 Avenue NE was extended to the east across West Nose Creek and the Canadian Pacific Railway tracks to meet the existing interchange at Deerfoot Trail and Airport Trail. It provided an alternative to Beddington Trail and Country Hills Boulveard for access to the neighbourhood of Harvest Hills. Highly visible from Deerfoot, the ring received national attention and was called "awful" and "terrible" by Calgary mayor Naheed Nenshi, and "an example of bureaucracy run amok" by Councillor Jyoti Gondek. The mostly negative feedback prompted Calgary to review its allocation of funds to public art on infrastructure projects. As part of Stoney Trail construction in 2013, Deerfoot Trail was upgraded between the most southerly Bow River crossing north and McKenzie Lake Boulevard. It was widened to six through lanes from Stoney Trail to the Bow River at Calgary's southern limit, and elevated directional ramps were added to the major interchange at Deerfoot and Stoney Trail to support significantly higher traffic levels. A braided ramp was constructed northbound between Cranston Avenue and Stoney Trail, preventing northbound traffic exiting to eastbound Stoney Trail from conflicting with Auburn Bay and Cranston traffic merging onto northbound Deerfoot Trail.

Future 

In March 2017, construction of a partial cloverleaf interchange was approved in south Calgary at 212 Avenue SE, between the Bow River and 192 Avenue. Calgary paid for the project initially, and will later be repaid by Alberta and Brookfield Residential, who are developing the neighbourhood in the vicinity of the interchange. Prior to a firm commitment for a portion of the funding by Brookfield, Alberta had been reluctant to front the estimated $50 million in funding required for the project, though the city of Calgary had offered to pay for it in the interim as long as the money was paid back by the province. The city had also considered contributing $20 million in tandem with Brookfield, with the province paying for the remaining $30 million. City councillor Shane Keating stated in August 2016 that development of the Seton neighbourhood will be hampered until the 212 Avenue interchange is completed.

A study was completed by Alberta in 2007 to determine the best course of action for upgrades to the incomplete interchange of Glenmore Trail and Deerfoot Trail. The interchange carries 130,000 vehicles per day on Deerfoot Trail and 100,000 vehicles on Glenmore making it one of the busiest interchanges in Alberta, but there is no direct access for traffic turning from northbound Deerfoot to westbound Glenmore. Stage 1 of the proposed improvements would not remedy this problem, but rather correct a pinch point on Deerfoot Trail by constructing a new three lane bridge to carry the northbound lanes over Glenmore. Deerfoot Trail would then be three lanes each way through the interchange. Ultimately, a large cloverstack interchange is planned with left-turn movements handled by third-level directional flyovers providing free-flowing access to and from Deerfoot Trail.  The proposed ultimate configuration would require acquisition of land from adjacent properties for the construction of the flyovers and other modifications to Glenmore Trail.

The planning study also calls for the construction of a new bridge alongside the existing Calf Robe Bridge, as part of a local-express system between Peigan and Glenmore Trails. Glenmore Trail would be widened to as many as 10 lanes between Blackfoot and Deerfoot Trails, along with modifications of the interchange at Blackfoot Trail, and the addition of braided ramps to facilitate the new flyovers.

Alberta Transportation and the city of Calgary began a study in 2016 to develop short-term and long-term plans for Deerfoot Trail. Almost the entire length of the freeway is being assessed, though changes are not anticipated for the two major interchanges at Stoney Trail, completed in 2009 and 2013. The study aimed to address Deerfoot's problems overall, as opposed to localized solutions that could simply shift traffic bottlenecks to another section of the freeway. Five short-term options were presented in May 2017; they included a braided ramp in south Calgary between Southland Drive and Anderson Road, a jughandle intersection at 32 Avenue NE and 12 Street NE, left turn restrictions on McKnight Boulveard east of Deerfoot, and a pair of new northbound on-ramps between McKnight Boulevard and Airport Trail. All possibilities for improvement were considered, including high-occupancy vehicle lanes. Despite the initial fixes presented by the study, Alberta Transportation did not include any of the proposed projects on the list of unfunded capital projects. In 2017, the City of Calgary began work to construct a 2-lane bridge for bus rapid transit over Deerfoot Trail south of 17 Avenue SE. As part of Calgary Transit's developing network of bus-only routes, the new bridge does not interchange with Deerfoot Trail and was completed in late 2018.

In March 2019, Transportation Minister Brian Mason announced plans for $478 million worth of improvements to a  stretch of Deerfoot between Beddington Trail in the north and Anderson Road in the south. The United Conservative Party later reduced this commitment to a total of $210 million, with no construction yet scheduled . The joint Deerfoot Trail study was completed in early 2021, summarizing the short and long-term improvement options that had been presented throughout the study period.

Exit list

See also
Transportation in Calgary

Notes

References

External links

Alberta Transportation – Deerfoot Trail
Deerfoot Trail southbound timelapse
Deerfoot Trail northbound timelapse

Deerfoot
Roads in Calgary